C. S. Dubey was an Indian professional field hockey player. He was part of the India hockey team which won gold medal at the 1952 Summer Olympics and also part of football club Mohan Bagan in 1948.

References

Year of birth missing
Place of birth missing
Year of death missing
Place of death missing
Olympic field hockey players of India
Olympic gold medalists for India
Field hockey players at the 1952 Summer Olympics
Indian male field hockey players
Olympic medalists in field hockey
Medalists at the 1952 Summer Olympics